Callona rutilans is a species of beetle in the family Cerambycidae. It was described by Bates in 1869.

References

Callona
Beetles described in 1869